Galeazzo di Santa Sofia (died 1427) was an Italian physician and anatomist.

Life 
He taught medicine at the universities in Bologna and Padua. He was called to Vienna where he introduced anatomy as a subject of study and in 1404 made the first dissection north of the Alps.

References

Bibliography 
 

Italian anatomists
15th-century Italian physicians
1427 deaths
14th-century Italian physicians